K30HB-D is a low-power television station in Hagåtña, Guam. Unlike its sister stations, K28HS-D 28, K32GB 32 and K36GJ-D 36, its signal reaches all of the island. From 2002 to 2007, it was a repeater of the Trinity Broadcast Network, but it is now a repeater of KUAM-TV.

30HB-D
2005 establishments in Guam
Television channels and stations established in 2005
Low-power television stations in the United States